"Looking for a New Love" is a song by American dance-pop singer Jody Watley. It was released in January 1987 as the first single from her eponymous debut album. The song reached number two on the US Billboard Hot 100 and charted in several countries worldwide, peaking at number one in Canada. Watley re-recorded and re-issued the song in various remixes in 2005.

Background
While listening to a tape of instrumental tracks given to her by producer André Cymone, Watley reflected on a recent sour romantic breakup. Fusing her own feelings of "I'll show you" with the feel of the track, Watley came up with the basic premise of "Looking for a New Love." The released record is the eight-track demo of the song; that way the emotional urgency of Watley's vocal was still intact. One of the song's key phrases became a popular saying: "Hasta la vista, baby." It wound up on innumerable answering machines and was used by Arnold Schwarzenegger in the 1991 film Terminator 2: Judgment Day (see Hasta la vista, baby).

Reception
The single hit number two for four consecutive weeks on the US Billboard Hot 100 in May 1987 and spent three weeks at number one on the Billboard Hot Black Singles chart. It ranked number 16 on Billboards year-end chart for 1987. The song also reached number one on the RPM Singles Chart in Canada. In 1988, the song was nominated for two Soul Train Music Awards for Best R&B/Soul or Rap Music Video, and Best R&B/Soul Single, Female. She was also nominated for a Grammy Award for Best Female R&B Vocal Performance.

Music video
A music video, directed by Brian Grant was released in March 1987 to promote the song. Grant previously made videos for Whitney Houston, Peter Gabriel and Tina Turner.

2005 version
In 2005, Jody Watley re-recorded and released "Looking for a New Love" on Curvve Recordings in conjunction with her own Avitone label, and Peace Bisquit. The newly imagined "Looking for a New Love" peaked at number one on the Hot Dance Music/Club Play chart, making her the first artist to take the same song to number one in two decades.

Awards and nominations

Track listing
Maxi-CD 2005

Charts

Weekly charts

Year-end charts

Certifications

Release history

See also
 List of number-one dance singles of 2005 (U.S.)

References

Jody Watley songs
1986 songs
1987 debut singles
MCA Records singles
RPM Top Singles number-one singles
Songs written by André Cymone
Songs written by Jody Watley